This is a list of broadcasters for the Anaheim Ducks ice hockey team.

Radio
In 2006–07, KLAA (AM) assumed the broadcast rights for the Anaheim Ducks, a National Hockey League team. That team went on to win the Stanley Cup in June 2007.

Television
In the Los Angeles market, in the case of scheduling conflicts, Fox Sports West and Prime Ticket will move a scheduled telecast of an Angels, Clippers, Ducks, or Kings game to KCOP-TV (Channel 13), the local MyNetworkTV owned-and-operated station and sister station to the two networks.

Disney planned to start an ESPN West regional sports network for the 1998–99 season, which would also carry Anaheim Angels baseball games, but the plan was abandoned.

Current on-air staff

 John Ahlers – Anaheim Ducks play-by-play announcer 
 Kent French — Angels Live and Ducks Live host
 Brian Hayward – Anaheim Ducks commentator and Duck Live analyst
 Guy Hebert — Ducks Live analyst
 Mike Pomeranz — Ducks Live host (rotating)

References

External links
Broadcasters | Anaheim Ducks - NHL.com
Ducks Hockey - Angels Radio AM 830
Prime Ticket, FOX Sports San Diego to televise 70 Anaheim Ducks games during 2018-19 season
Anaheim Ducks 2019-2020 TV Broadcast Schedule

 
broadcasters
Lists of National Hockey League broadcasters
Prime Sports
Fox Sports Networks
Bally Sports